The Tashkent Rebellion was a 1917 conflict between revolutionary forces and loyalists of the Russian Provisional Government, which occurred in Tashkent, in what is now Uzbekistan. Rule shifted to various political parties in the city, and the Tashkent Soviet was created. As time progressed, Imperial officials were replaced, the soviet gained more power, and a regional soviet was created in addition to the existing council. The Russian Provisional Government began attempting to regain control in April, but the soviets tightly restricted its efforts.

In , the Provisional Government fell, and loyalists attempted to disarm and imprison rebels, with partial success. Rebels captured the fortress that night, arresting all loyalist leaders and cadets residing there. In the aftermath, the soviet was represented entirely by Bolsheviks, in spite of their limited role in the rebellion itself. Some Muslims and Turkic peoples in the surrounding areas resisted soviet control, but the region would nonetheless become the Turkestan Autonomous Soviet Socialist Republic.

Background
Tashkent—in present-day Uzbekistan—was conquered by the Russian Empire in 1865, during a period of Russian expansion throughout Central Asia. It was officially annexed the following year, by Tsar Alexander II, planned as the administrative centre of Russia's recently conquered lands. Russian settlers began arriving soon after, creating their own quarter of the city in which to reside.

Prelude
Kuropatkin did not want to immediately announce these developments, however employees of the telegraph service spread the news to the general population. The existing political parties included the Constitutional Democratic Party, the Socialist Revolutionaries, and in much smaller numbers, the Russian Social Democratic Labour Party, although none were able to immediately take control. While later Soviet historians often emphasise the role of the Bolsheviks, most members of the Social Democratic Labour Party belonged to the Menshevik faction, and even combined, there were so few Social Democrats in total that they had to collaborate with the Socialist Revolutionaries, anarchists, Bundists, and other groups.

The next day, another Menshevik, a G. I. Broido, created a soviet of soldiers' deputies. The former body, which held moderate views, included officers, government officials, and merchants, while the latter, with 120 members in total, included almost 60 army officers. Both were headquartered at a public meeting hall. The two merged on  into a single Tashkent Soviet, with Bel'kov as their chairman.

More moderate groups formed a local provisional government, in the building that had previously held the city's local duma. Their first meeting occurred on 4 March, attended by 250 people, mostly Constitutional Democrats, although all twenty attending railroad employees were Social Democrats. On , Kuropatkin read Nicholas II's manifesto of abdication at a town meeting in Cathedral Square, as well as Grand Duke Michael's renunciation of the throne and a message from Georgy Lvov. Kuropatkin asked them to pledge their loyalty to the State Duma, work toward a military victory, and maintain public order. A new commander was elected for the Turkestan Military District, Colonel Leonty Nikolaevich Cherkes, who would later attain the rank of Major General. This marked the beginning of a leftward political shift.

The pro-soviet forces were at an advantage, aided by the removal of former leaders and military administrators from office. A local food crisis, a result of a bad crop and distributional issues, was too severe for the local duma to deal with, so the soviet began overseeing food distribution, gradually gaining more governmental power. During , the First Regional Congress of Workers' and Soldiers' Deputies met in the city to form a regional soviet, which was relatively moderate in nature. It shared power with the Executive Committee of the Tashkent Soviet in the city of Tashkent, although it had greater control over the rest of Turkestan. Both replaced Imperial officials with pro-soviet counterparts and worked to provide soviet administration to the region.

In mid-April (O.S.), representatives for the Russian Provisional Government arrived in the city to restore authority, not granting recognition to the soviet government. They appointed a Turkestan Committee in Petrograd, with an N. N. Shchepkin as its chairman and an additional four Russian and four Muslim members. Several were former State Duma members, and several were also Constitutional Democrats or Constitutional Democrat–inclined. Each time the committee attempted to gain support or carry out administrative tasks, the soviet government questioned the legality or attempted to counter the efforts. Shchepkin appealed for recall after weeks of the ordeal. Two new officials were selected, considered to be more left-wing: Vladimir Nalivkin and an I. N. Shendrikov. Despite Nalivkin and Shendrikov's efforts, the two soviets maintained their authority, and the Provisional Government could not undertake any actions without their permission.

In April (O.S.), the left's power grew as banished revolutionaries, including Social Democrats and Social Revolutionaries, who had been exiled in 1907–1909 began to return. At a  meeting of the regional Russian Social Democratic Labour Party, out of thirty-one individuals with the right to vote, twenty-four were Mensheviks and seven were Bolsheviks. Despite this, the Tashkent Soviet itself did not support taking power into its own hands.

Rebellion
The Turkestan Committee was aware of the severity of the situation in Tashkent, and attempted to dispatch a commissar general to the region, however in late August, this was cut short by the Kornilov affair, which strengthened the revolutionary movement. The regional soviet tried several officers for speaking favourably about Lavr Kornilov, and 5,000 railroad workers met to demand that power be given to the soviets. On , soldiers from the First Siberian Regiment searched natives on a train for food, confiscating what they found. The Revolutionary Committee was formed, demanding the soviets take power, with five Bolsheviks—including Tobolin as chairman, two Mensheviks, five Socialist Revolutionaries, and two anarchists. This move upset both the regional soviet and the Provisional Government, and General Cherkes mobilised cadets from the military school to arrest most of the committee. Under threat of armed retribution by the First and Second Siberian Regiments, the prisoners were released. General Cherkes and the cadets were arrested, and the regional soviet was dissolved.

The Committee managed to free and arm the cadets, and amass a total force of 900, stationed at the local fortress and throughout all government buildings in the city. The soviet demanded that it be recalled, the refusal of which led to a general strike.

In terms of suppression of rebellious sentiment, Korovichenko was largely ineffective overall, as he was inclined toward nonviolent measures, such as not disarming rebellious members of the garrison and believing negotiation was a valid alternative. He also ignored advice given to him by those under him and removed Nalivkin from his position as head of the Turkestan Committee. Now populated mostly by extremists, led by the Bolsheviks, the congress took over the activities of the regional soviet, calling again for all power to the soviets. Concurrently, Korovichenko tried to expel rebellious units from the city, some of which were his own troops, with partial success. None were killed, but the group surrendered. This event harmed Korovichenko's reputation among workers and townspeople. Martial law was again declared, and the disarming of rebellious units was ordered, as well as the arrests of all leaders of the rebellion in September. The loyalists were able to disarm the First Siberian Regiment but failed to do so to the Second Siberian Regiment, which had been warned in advance.

The rebels amassed a force of 3,000, which included German and Hungarian prisoners of war, which successfully disarmed three of sotnias of loyal Cossacks. The declared that peace needed to be found. Despite being advised otherwise, Korovichenko consented. The gates opened later in the night, and the rebels took control of the fortress. Despite their agreement otherwise, the rebels arrested all leaders and cadets present, including Korovichenko and Shendrikov, a total of about 300. Some were executed, and loyalists were hunted down in the aftermath, as power shifted to the soviets.

Aftermath
The new representative body created in the aftermath of the rebellion was populated entirely by Bolsheviks. In the time following their victory, Orenburg Cossacks sabotaged the railway between Tashkent and Moscow, attempting to keep food from Tashkent and isolate it from European Russia, which was now under the control of Vladimir Lenin and the Bolsheviks. The Semirechye Oblast refused to grant recognition to the Tashkent Soviet, and Samarkand's professional unions decided they would not send delegates to the city at a meeting on 14 December. The soviet declared a state of siege on 26 December. In January of the following year, the Muslim clergy of Fergana published a manifest which condemned Russians as "infidels and tyrants". They also called on their fellow Muslims to form their own federation.

The Muslim government which controlled Fergana was overthrown, but struggles continued with Bukharan Revolution, which interrupted traffic along the Trans-Caspian Railway. Although the Turkic people were a majority in the area dependedent on the railway, which stretched from Fergana to Baku, they were not the only ethnic group, and local Armenians were open to Bolshevik ideas due to their conflict with Turkic groups. By the middle of April 1918, the Bolsheviks and Tashkent Soviet had defeated all the resistance in the region, and later in May it was reorganised as the Turkestan Autonomous Soviet Socialist Republic.

References

History of Tashkent
Military history of Uzbekistan
Russian Civil War